The NEL (Nordeuropäische Erdgasleitung (English: Northern European natural gas pipeline), formerly known as Norddeutsche Erdgasleitung, is a  long natural gas pipeline in Germany.

Route
The pipeline runs from Lubmin near Greifswald through Sülstorf and Achim to Rehden. It connects the Nord Stream 1 pipeline with the Rehden-Hamburg and MIDAL pipelines. The pipeline started operations on 5 November 2012. Between Sülstorf and Achim, it uses a pre-existing installation.

Technical features
The pipeline is expected to cost around €1 billion.

The developer of the pipeline asked exemption from the network access and transit fees regulation; however, this request was denied.

Project company
The pipeline was built by OPAL NEL TRANSPORT GmbH.  It is operated by NEL Gastransport GmbH, owned by WIGA Transport Beteiligungs-GmbH & Co. KG, a joint venture of Wintershall Dea and Gazprom.

See also

Nord Stream 1
Rehden-Hamburg gas pipeline
MIDAL
OPAL pipeline
Gazela Pipeline

References

External links

 

Natural gas pipelines in Germany
Gazprom pipelines